Agalmatidae, or Agalmidae, is a family of siphonophores.

Systematic list
Genus Agalma Eschscholtz, 1825
Agalma clausi Bedot, 1888
Agalma elegans (Sars, 1846)
Agalma okenii Eschscholtz, 1825
 Genus Athorybia Eschscholtz, 1829
 Athorybia lucida Biggs, 1978
 Athorybia rosacea (Forskål, 1775)
 Genus Frillagalma Daniel, 1966
 Frillagalma vityazi Daniel, 1966
Genus Halistemma Huxley, 1859
Halistemma cupulifera Lens & van Riemsdijk, 1908
Halistemma foliacea (Quoy & Gaimard, 1833)
Halistemma maculatum Pugh & Baxter, 2014
Halistemma rubrum (Vogt, 1852)
Halistemma striata Totton, 1965
Halistemma transliratum Pugh & Youngbluth, 1988
Genus Lychnagalma Haeckel, 1888
Lychnagalma utricularia (Claus, 1879)
Genus Marrus Totton, 1954
Marrus antarcticus Totton, 1954
Marrus claudanielis Dunn, Pugh & Haddock, 2005
Marrus orthocanna (Kramp, 1942)
Marrus orthocannoides Totton, 1954
Genus Melophysa Haeckel, 1888
Melophysa melo (Quoy & Gaimard, 1827)
Genus Nanomia A. Agassiz, 1865
Nanomia bijuga (Delle Chiaje, 1844)
Nanomia cara Agassiz, 1865
Genus Rudjakovia Margulis, 1982
Rudjakovia plicata Margulis, 1982

Former genera
Agalmopsis Sars, 1846 accepted as Agalma Eschscholtz, 1825
Lynchagalma accepted as Lychnagalma Haeckel, 1888
Moseria Totton, 1965 accepted as Resomia Pugh, 2006

Nomen dubium
The following names of uncertain status have been placed in the family.
Paragalma Margulis, 1976
Stepanyantsia

References
Mapstone, G. (2011). Agalmatidae. In: Schuchert, P. World Hydrozoa database. Accessed through the World Register of Marine Species on 2011-09-08

 
Physonectae
Taxa named by Johann Friedrich von Eschscholtz
Cnidarian families